The Toyota Highlander, also known as the , is a mid-size crossover SUV with three-row seating produced by Toyota since 2000.

Announced in April 2000 at the New York International Auto Show and arriving in late 2000 in Japan and January 2001 in North America, the Highlander became one of the first car-based mid-size SUV or mid-size crossovers. The Highlander is the crossover counterpart to the more rugged, truck-based mid-size 4Runner and became Toyota's best-selling SUV before being surpassed by the smaller RAV4 in 2006.

The first-generation model was sold in Japan as the Kluger, which was exclusive to dealership network called Toyota Netz as a larger alternative to the RAV4. The Kluger nameplate is also used in Australia because "Highlander" is a trademarked trim line name owned by Hyundai. The name is derived from the German word klug, which means smart or clever ("Kluger", written in German with an Ü instead of a U, means "someone who is smarter than another").



First generation (XU20; 2000) 

The Highlander (or Kluger in Japan and Australia) shared a platform with its XU30 series Lexus RX/Toyota Harrier cousin.  It came in five (2001–2007) and seven-seat (2004–2007) configurations and became a sales success for Toyota in a number of markets across the world. The Highlander came standard with front-wheel drive and offered all-wheel drive (50:50 front:rear fixed torque split). Unlike Toyota's own 4Runner and other mid-sized competitors such as the Jeep Grand Cherokee, or Chevrolet TrailBlazer, the Highlander aimed for on-road comfort with its unibody construction and independent rear suspension. Although it was longer than the 1996–2002 4Runner available at the time it was launched, the Highlander was surpassed in length by the redesigned 4Runner in August 2002.

The Highlander was available in three trim lines in the United States: the base model, the Sport model, and the Limited model. The base and Limited models were present when the Highlander was initially introduced, while the Sport model was introduced in March 2006.

In 2004, the wheels on the Limited trim changed from a six-spoke to a five-spoke alloy. The base-model Highlander wheels also changed from steel-rims to the alloy wheels that were on the 2001–2003 model year Highlander Limited and B-Package. The Sport models had a distinctive grille design, differentiating themselves from the non-Sport models. Wheel styling also serves to differentiate the various models—the hybrid sports a unique twin-spoke design.

The Kluger was introduced to Australia in October 2003. It was available in three guises: CV, CVX, and Grande. A limited edition CV Sport model was also released in 2006. There was no hybrid model available in Australia. The only engine offered was the 3.3-liter 3MZ-FE V6.

Engines:
 2001–2007 2.4 L 2AZ-FE I4,
 2001–2003 3.0 L 1MZ-FE V6, 
 2004–2007 3.3 L 3MZ-FE V6, 

In 2004 the Kluger was given a new 3.3-liter V6 engine to compete with the more powerful V6 offerings from its competitors, mainly the Nissan Murano and the Honda Pilot. The larger engine made it possible for the Kluger to reach  in 7.8 seconds.

2001 update 
The Japanese and Australian Kluger was released with a center console integrated with the dashboard, while the North American Highlander initially lacked this integrated center console. The integrated center console was introduced in all US Highlanders and in Canadian Limited Highlanders in 2001, for the 2002 model year, and in all Canadian Highlanders in 2003, for the 2004 model year. However, for these early Highlanders without the integrated center console, a smaller non-integrated stand-alone center console was available as an option, either factory or dealer installed.

2003 update 

In 2003, for the 2004 model year, in addition to the 3.3-liter engine, V6-powered models were equipped with a new five-speed automatic transmission, replacing the four-speed automatic transmission, while the inline-four models continued to use the old four-speed. This year also saw the introduction of the optional third row seat allowing for two additional passengers. The center console, which was previously exclusive to the Limited trim level, was now standard across all trims. A DVD-based navigation system was introduced to the Highlander for the first time as an option on the Limited trim. The unibody was slightly modified behind the second row seats to include a depression in the hatch floor able to accommodate the optional third row seating. On models without third row seating, this depression was turned into a storage compartment (prior to 2004 the spare tire was accessible from inside the vehicle where the third row seating would subsequently be located; beginning in 2004 the spare tire is accessible from underneath the vehicle).  Subtle changes to the front grille, front and rear bumpers, headlights and tail lights (LED tail lights on later hybrid models) round-out the major changes for the 2003 mid-cycle refresh.

2005 update 
In 2005, for the 2006 model year, Highlanders sold in Canada were offered only in a V6 all-wheel drive configuration. Hybrid models were available with part-time four-wheel drive, which Toyota refers to as 4WD-i whereby the rear wheels are powered by a separate electric motor. This system is intended for use on snow and ice and is prone to overheating the rear electric motor off-road.

Safety 
Anti-lock brakes, brake assist and electronic brakeforce distribution were standard, Vehicle Stability Control w/traction control optional on 2001–03 models became standard for 2004 models (Hybrids come standard with VDIM). Also standard for 2004 was a tire pressure monitor. Front seat-mounted side torso airbags were optional on 2001–06 models, while front and second row side curtain airbags were optional on 2004–06 models. Side airbags became standard on 2007 models and the curtain airbags gained a rollover sensor that year as well.

In Insurance Institute for Highway Safety (IIHS) crash tests the Highlander was rated "Good" overall in the frontal offset crash test. The IIHS reported the Highlander had one of the lowest driver fatality rates among all vehicles, and amongst SUVs, only the Toyota 4Runner had a lower driver fatality rate. This report looked at 2001–2005 model year vehicles in the US.

Hybrid (MHU28, 2005) 

Initially, the Kluger was a regular, non-hybrid SUV driven by an internal combustion engine, but later Toyota introduced a hybrid version, the Kluger Hybrid that utilizes the company's Hybrid Synergy Drive technology combined with the company's 3MZ-FE 3.3-liter V6 engine offered in either FWD or AWD trim. The hybrid drivetrain was unveiled at the 2004 North American International Auto Show, and was offered to the public in July 2005 as a 2006 model. The power steering pump, water pump and AC compressor were changed from belt-drive to electrically powered versions. A modified alternator was incorporated into the hybrid system.

In North America, the hybrid version was called the Highlander Hybrid. It was also the first seven-seat hybrid vehicle. With the electric motors providing power, overall acceleration improved, particularly at passing speeds. Other additions include Toyota's Vehicle Dynamics Integrated Management (VDIM) system and Electronically Controlled Brake (ECB). The California Air Resources Board gave it a SULEV emission rating. The U.S. Environmental Protection Agency (revised standards) rated it at  City/ Highway for FWD models and / for AWD models. This system is near identical to that of the Lexus RX 400h. All-wheel drive models were rated to tow .

Second generation (XU40; 2007) 

Toyota revealed the second generation Highlander and Highlander Hybrid at the 2007 Chicago Auto Show, with American sales beginning in July and hybrids in late September. The second generation Highlander and Highlander Hybrid were not sold in Japan. The five-seat Highlander for the United States and Canada was dropped as the Venza replaced it.

Initially the sole powertrain for the 2008 Highlander was a  3.5-liter 2GR-FE V6 mated to a five-speed automatic. The four-cylinder model had been discontinued but added again in 2009. The EPA estimated fuel economy for front-wheel drive models is at
 city /  highway (last gen:  city /  hwy).

For 2009, Toyota again offered a 4-cylinder for 5-passenger front-wheel drive models with the all-new ULEV-II certified 2.7-liter 1AR-FE I4 paired to a six-speed automatic. The four-cylinder delivers an EPA estimated fuel economy of  city and  highway. This is better than the previous model's four-cylinder with /.

The same three trim levels were offered (Base, Sport and Limited) until early 2010 when the SE model replaced the Sport model, buyers are still able to choose between front-wheel drive or all-wheel drive on V6 platforms. Also new is an Electric Power Steering (EPS) system. Sport and Limited models get a standard backup camera using a 3.5-inch LCD display. Major options include leather seats, heated seats, a touchscreen DVD based navigation system, a new Smart Key System, an upgraded JBL Synthesis stereo, a rear-seat DVD entertainment system with 9-inch screen, and a towing package that increases towing capacity to 5000 pounds.

The XU40 was initially produced exclusively at Toyota Motor Kyushu's Miyata plant for all global markets beginning in May 2007. Production in China for local sales was started on 25 May 2009 by GAC Toyota in Nansha District, Guangzhou, Guangdong. Toyota had intended on building the Highlander in Blue Springs, Mississippi for the North American market in the 2011 model year. However, the Corolla was built there instead, and the Highlander is being built at Toyota Motor Manufacturing Indiana in Princeton, Indiana, from the 2010 model year onward for a majority of North America, replacing Tundra production. TMMI Highlander production began in October 2009 for gasoline engine models only; hybrids continued to be imported from Japan until the release of the third generation XU50, where all production except for China was consolidated at TMMI.

In Australia, the new generation Kluger was launched in August 2007. There are three trims available, KX-R, KX-S and Grande. All trims are available with either 2WD or AWD. The base model KX-R is also available with either five or seven seats, whilst the latter trims are seven seaters only. Specifications are mostly similar to the US Highlander, sharing the same 3.5-litre V6 2GR-FE engine and five-speed automatic transmission.

2010 update 

In 2010, for the 2011 model year, Toyota made some changes to the Highlander and Highlander Hybrid. While the general design remains similar to the 2010 model, the Highlander's front end has been significantly revised, now featuring new headlights, a new black with chrome accent rocker panel, and new front grille. The non-hybrid engines for 2011 remain the same, although now the 2.7-liter four-cylinder engine may be had on the SE trim level, previously only available on the base model. More standard features are now equipped on all trim levels, with the base model receiving front and rear air conditioning, power locks/windows, cruise control, and a multi-function keyless entry control. The facelifted model was also sold in Russia from 2010-2013.

Pre-facelift styling

Post-facelift styling

Safety 

All models come standard with enhanced Vehicle Stability Control which immediately alters electric powering steering assist w/traction control (hybrids come standard with VDIM), anti-lock brakes, brake assist and electronic brakeforce distribution. Also standard is a tire pressure monitor, a driver's knee airbag, front seat-mounted side torso airbags, side curtain airbags for all three rows which includes a rollover sensor and active front headrests. Hill Start Assist Control (HAC) is also standard which prevents rolling backwards on slopes, and Downhill Assist Control (DAC) is standard on AWD trims.

The IIHS rates the Highlander "Good" overall in their frontal offset crash test, and good in all subcategories except for "Head/neck," which is rated as "Acceptable." And "Good" overall in the side impact crash test, with "Good" rating in all nine measured categories. The Highlander is also rated "Good" in the roof strength test, giving it a "top safety pick" rating.

In Australasian New Car Assessment Program (ANCAP) testing the Kluger is given a  rating but only a  rating for pedestrian protection.

The safety and effectiveness of the Highlander/Kluger's Vehicle Stability Control system has been questioned by some motoring journalists. During testing for Wheels magazine Car of the Year in 2007, the magazine's editor rolled the vehicle during high-speed gravel road testing. Noting that it was the first such event in the magazine's 45-year history, he criticised the vehicle's stability system stating that "Deficiencies in the Kluger's ESP contributed to the crash". Six of the seven other judges also stated that they felt "the vehicle's ESP performance was sub-standard", and remarked that the vehicle was "almost dangerous on dirt [roads]". In a written response, Toyota disputed the circumstances of the accident and criticised the testing procedures as "unscientific".

Hybrid 

The Hybrid features Toyota's Hybrid Synergy Drive which continues to allow an electric only powered mode for short distances and speeds. Weight and cost have been improved over the previous hybrid.

The expanded size and new features have led to an increase of 500 pounds to its curb weight. The Highlander's fuel economy, while better than the Lexus RX 400h's, lags behind the compact 4cyl Ford Escape Hybrid, which ceased production in 2012, and the latest RX 450h, but still produces significantly fewer emissions than the non-hybrid version with a CARB SULEV rating.

VDIM and Electronically Controlled Brake remain new features include a driver selectable electric only EV mode (when possible) and another ECON mode which restricts acceleration and minimizes air conditioning during acceleration. The Highlander Hybrid Hybrid uses a 1.9 kWh sealed nickel-metal hydride traction battery.

Highlander FCHV (2007) 

The vehicle was unveiled at the 2007 LA Auto Show.

Chinese version 
The Chinese version of the Highlander (ASU40/GSU45) was unveiled in 2009 at the 13th Shanghai International Automobile Industry Exhibition.

Third generation (XU50; 2013) 

On 27 March 2013, Toyota unveiled the third generation XU50 series Highlander at the New York International Auto Show, with plans to have the vehicle reach dealerships in early 2014. Production began on 5 December. The XU50 version is longer and wider than the outgoing generation and its design has changed from its boxy look to one that is similar to other mid-size crossover SUVs.

In addition to the changes, the XU50 featured seating for eight people with a sliding second-row point of entry that gives it  of added width space, soft-touch materials on the instrument panel, lane-departure warning, pre-collision warning and blind spot monitoring systems. HD Radio and Bluetooth was standard on all trims for the US version, which will also come equipped with Toyota's Entune multimedia system along with a 6.1-inch touchscreen display audio system. An eight-inch touchscreen system and Toyota's Entune app suite with 12 JBL speakers were offered as an optional feature. The three powertrain trims that were offered include a 2.7-liter, six-speed automatic, front-wheel drive base model, a 3.5-liter, six-speed automatic model in both front- or all-wheel drive, and the AWD-only Hybrid trim with a 3.5-liter V6 mated to an eCVT.

The Highlander is also approved for use as a New York City taxicab.

For the third-generation model, Toyota Motor Sales USA took the role of producing the Kluger for Australia and New Zealand after Japanese production of the second-generation model ended in 2013. When the model was replaced with the succeeding XU70 model in 2019, production in the US continued for exports to both countries until 2021.

2016 facelift 

A refreshed 2017 model year Highlander appeared at the New York International Auto Show in March 2016 with sales starting in the fourth quarter of 2016. In V6 powered models, an eight-speed automatic replaced the six-speeder and the revised V6 engine (now designated 2GR-FKS) added Toyota's D4-S direct injection fuel system. The facelifted Highlander has an updated fascia with restyled headlights and tail lights, addition of SE trim, XLE and LE Hybrid trims, and updated exterior and interior colors.

Pre-facelift styling

Post-facelift styling

Chinese market facelift styling

Safety 

1 vehicle structure rated "Acceptable"
2 vehicle structure rated "Marginal"
3 strength-to-weight ratio: 5.40

Fourth generation (XU70; 2019) 

The fourth-generation Highlander was unveiled at the New York International Auto Show on 17 April 2019. It is built on GA-K platform. In the United States, the fourth-generation Highlander gasoline model went on sale on 18 December 2019 for the 2020 model year. Compared to the previous generation, there is increased cargo room behind the third row and support was added for both Apple CarPlay and Android Auto.

In Europe, the Highlander Hybrid went on sale in January 2021, solely with a hybrid powertrain. The Highlander for the UK market has been available since March 2021, a year later than the US models due to the extensive engineering work for right-hand-drive models, while the Kluger for the Australian market became available since June 2021. The Highlander was also launched across Gulf Cooperation Council countries around June and July of 2020, where it's offered as a Hybrid only.

China 
In China, the fourth-generation Highlander was launched on 19 April 2021 at the Auto Shanghai. The Highlander continued to be built and sold by GAC Toyota joint venture. A twin model manufactured by FAW Toyota was launched simultaneously as the Crown Kluger. The Crown Kluger is based on the Highlander XSE sold in North America, with the Toyota badge on the front grille and steering wheel swapped for the Crown badge. Both are powered by a 2.5-liter engine with hybrid powertrain as an option.

North America 
The fourth-generation Highlander in the U.S. is offered in five trim levels, three of which are carried over from the previous generation: LE, XLE, and Limited, as well the base L, and the top-of-the-line Platinum. The hybrid model became available in North America in February 2020.

Yearly changes 
 2020, for the 2021 model year: In North America, the XSE trim was added. The L, LE and XLE trims came with standard LED projector headlights and a standard Toyota Safety Sense 2.5+ for all trims.

 2021, for the 2022 model year: In the US, the Bronze Edition of the Highlander Hybrid was unveiled for the 2022 model year. It builds on the XLE Hybrid trim.

 2022, for the 2023 model year: The 2.4-liter T24A-FTS turbocharged four-cylinder engine replaced the 3.5-liter 2GR-FKS V6 engine option. In the US, this change was made due to the implementation of tougher automotive emission standards for the 2023 model year imposed by the Environmental Protection Agency. The 2.4-liter unit has  less compared to the outgoing 3.5-liter unit, but has 17 percent more torque. In addition, Toyota claimed that the 2.4-liter unit cut  and non-methane organic gas (NMOG) emissions by more than 50 percent. The hybrid powertrain remains unchanged. In addition to the updated powertrain, the Highlander also received some equipment updates as well.

Grand Highlander (2023) 

The Grand Highlander was introduced for the North American market on 8 February 2023. While sharing the nameplate and the GA-K platform with the regular Highlander, the model features entirely different exterior and interior styling. 

In the North American market, the Grand Highlander is positioned between the smaller Highlander and the larger, body-on-frame based Sequoia. Unlike its smaller counterpart, the Grand Highlander also offers a high-performance hybrid powertrain from the 2023 Crown, marketed as the Hybrid Max which pairs electric motors with a 2.4-liter turbocharged inline 4-cylinder. The powertrain also delivers a  towing capacity. 

Aside from the Hybrid Max powertrain, larger interior space is the point of differentiation of the Grand Highlander compared to the regular Highlander. Due to the redesigned multi-link rear suspension, the floor was able to be lowered, which has increased the heel-hip dimension in the third row seating. 

In the U.S., the Grand Highlander will be available in three grade levels: XLE, Limited, and Platinum.

Sales

References

External links 

 Official websites for Australia, Canada, China, US

Highlander
Cars introduced in 2000
2010s cars
2020s cars
Mid-size sport utility vehicles
Crossover sport utility vehicles
Front-wheel-drive vehicles
All-wheel-drive vehicles
Hybrid sport utility vehicles
Partial zero-emissions vehicles
Vehicles with CVT transmission
Motor vehicles manufactured in the United States